The Cedar Grove Weir is a weir located across the Logan River in the South East region of Queensland, Australia. The main purpose of the weir is for potable water storage.

Location and features
Initially managed by Queensland Water Infrastructure, a body set up to administer major water infrastructure projects, the weir is now managed by SEQ Water.

In conjunction with the South Maclean Weir and water treatment plants, the Cedar Grove Weir acts as a pumping pool for captured releases from Wyaralong Dam located upstream; and provides immediate supplies to the Beaudesert region. The weir also connects to the regional South East Queensland Water Grid. The weir overflowed for the first time on 4 January 2008.

See also

 List of dams and weirs in Queensland

References

External links 
 

Logan River
Dams in Queensland
Weirs
Dams completed in 2008
2008 establishments in Australia
Logan City